Turkish coffee is a style of coffee prepared in a cezve using very finely ground coffee beans without filtering.

Preparation
Turkish coffee is very finely ground coffee brewed by boiling. Any coffee bean may be used; arabica varieties are considered best, but robusta or a blend is also used. The coffee grounds are left in the coffee when served. The coffee may be ground at home in a manual grinder made for the very fine grind, ground to order by coffee merchants in most parts of the world, or bought ready-ground from many shops.

Coffee and water, usually with added sugar, is brought to the boil in a special pot called cezve in Turkey, and often called ibrik elsewhere. As soon as the mixture begins to froth, and before it boils over, it is taken off the heat; it may be briefly reheated twice more to increase the desired froth. Sometimes about one-third of the coffee is distributed to individual cups; the remaining amount is returned to the fire and distributed to the cups as soon as it comes to the boil. The coffee is traditionally served in a small porcelain cup called a  'coffee cup'.

The amount of sugar is specified when ordering the coffee. It may be unsweetened, with little or moderate sugar (or ), or sweet. Coffee is often served with something small and sweet to eat, such as Turkish delight. It is sometimes flavoured with cardamom, mastic, salep, or ambergris.

History

Turkish coffee probably was brought in the Ottoman Empire by traveling merchants by the 15th century. The governor in charge of Yemen, Özdemir Pasha, may have officially introduced it to Sultan Suleiman the Magnificent, who popularized it. Under the strictest interpretations of the Quran, the strong coffee was considered a drug and its consumption was forbidden. Sultan Murad IV outlawed coffee, but due to the immense popularity of the beverage, the prohibition was eventually lifted. 

Turkish coffee culture had reached Britain and France by the mid to late 17th century. The first coffee house in Britain was opened by an Ottoman Jew in the mid 17th century. In the 1680s, the Turkish ambassador to France reportedly threw lavish parties for the city's elite where African slaves served coffee to guests in porcelain finjans on gold or silver saucers.

Culture

Fortune-telling

The grounds left after drinking Turkish coffee are sometimes used to tell fortunes, a practice known as tasseography. The cup is turned over into the saucer to cool, and the patterns of the coffee grounds are interpreted.

Turkish weddings
As well as being an everyday beverage, Turkish coffee is also a part of the traditional Turkish wedding custom. As a prologue to marriage, the bridegroom's parents (in the lack of his father, his mother and an elderly member of his family) must visit the young girl's family to ask the hand of the bride-to-be and the blessings of her parents upon the upcoming marriage. During this meeting, the bride-to-be must prepare and serve Turkish coffee to the guests. For the groom's coffee, the bride-to-be sometimes uses salt instead of sugar to gauge his character. If the bridegroom drinks his coffee without any sign of displeasure, the bride-to-be assumes that the groom is good-tempered and patient. As the groom already comes as the demanding party to the girl's house, in fact it is the boy who is passing an exam and etiquette requires him to receive with all smiles this particular present from the girl, although in some parts of the country this may be considered as a lack of desire on the part of the girl for marriage with that candidate.

Names and variants

There is controversy about its name e.g. in some ex-Ottoman dependencies, mostly due to nationalistic feelings or political rivalry with Turkey.

Armenia
This type of strong coffee is a standard of Armenian households. Armenians introduced the coffee to Corfu when they settled the island, where it is known as "eastern coffee" due to its Eastern origin. Corfu, which had never been part of the Ottoman holdings, did not have an established Ottoman coffee culture before it was introduced by the Armenians. 
According to The Reuben Percy Anecdotes compiled by journalist Thomas Byerley, an Armenian opened a coffee shop in Europe in 1674, at a time when coffee was first becoming fashionable in the West. 

If unsweetened it is called , but more commonly it is brewed with a little sugar (normal). Armenians will sometimes serve a plate of baklava alongside the coffee.

Czech Republic, Slovakia, Poland and Lithuania 

Coffee is prepared in the same way in Poland and Lithuania.

Greece
In Greece, Turkish coffee was formerly referred to simply as 'Turkish'. But political tensions with Turkey in the 1960s led to the political euphemism Greek coffee," which became even more popular after the Turkish invasion of Cyprus in 1974: "... Greek–Turkish relations at all levels became strained, 'Turkish coffee' became 'Greek coffee' by substitution of one Greek word for another while leaving the Arabic loan-word, for which there is no Greek equivalent, unchanged." There were even advertising campaigns promoting the name Greek coffee in the 1990s.

Former Yugoslavia

In Bosnia and Herzegovina, Turkish coffee is also called Bosnian coffee, which is made slightly differently from its Turkish counterpart. A deviation from the Turkish preparation is that when the water reaches its boiling point, a small amount is saved aside for later, usually in a coffee cup. Then, the coffee is added to the pot (džezva), and the remaining water in the cup is added to the pot. Everything is put back on the heat source to reach its boiling point again, which only takes a couple of seconds since the coffee is already very hot. Coffee drinking in Bosnia is a traditional daily custom and plays an important role during social gatherings.

In Serbia, Slovenia, North Macedonia, Montenegro, and Croatia it is called 'Turkish coffee' (turška kava / turska kava / турска кафа / turska kafa), 'domestic coffee' (domača kava, домаћа кафа / domaća kafa / domaća kava) or simply 'coffee' (kava, кафа / kafa). It is nearly identical to the Turkish version. In Serbia, Turkish coffee is also called , which means 'Serbian coffee'.

See also

 List of coffee beverages

References

External links 

Arab cuisine
Coffee culture
Coffee drinks
Coffee preparation
Greek cuisine
Guest greeting food and drink
Levantine cuisine
Iraqi cuisine
Israeli cuisine
Jordanian cuisine
Lebanese cuisine
Ottoman cuisine
Palestinian cuisine
Turkish culture
Coffee culture in Bosnia and Herzegovina
Turkish drinks
Armenian drinks
Coffee